The Triumph Daytona 955i is a sport bike manufactured by Triumph from 1997 to 2006. It was powered by a  liquid cooled, inline three four stroke engine. The bike was launched in 1997 as the Triumph T595 Daytona and renamed Triumph Daytona 955i in 1999.

History

The Triumph Daytona T595 was introduced in 1997 in an attempt by Triumph to tap into the sports bike market. Despite the T595 name, the bike featured a 955 cc displacement in-line three-cylinder engine designed in part by Lotus. Along with the other triple-cylinder Triumphs, the Daytona helped to establish the newly managed manufacturer and its distinctive and unique three-cylinder motorcycles.

The T595-model name concatenated the new engine series "T5" and the first two numbers of the "955 cc" displacement. In 1998 the exhaust cam was advanced 5*. 1999 the bike received an update with new throttle bodies, injectors, fuel rail. The bike was renamed 955i because the T595 model name gave the impression that the bike's engine displaced 595 cc. The 2000+ 955i version had a more compact and advanced Sagem MC1000 electronic engine management system (2-plug) instead of the original Sagem MC2000 controller (1-plug)

Large-scale changes were made in 2001 for the 2002 model, with a complete restyling of the bodywork by designer Gareth Davies, a newly designed engine raising the horsepower to 149 with internal performance upgrades included Forged steel crankshaft, forged steel connecting rods, and forged aluminium pistons. Focussed on reducing weight and better handling, the 2001 955i used a more common double-sided swing arm (DSSA) as opposed to the single-sided swing arm (SSSA) of the previous Daytonas. The DSSA version weighs  less than the SSSA due to the lighter weight swing arm, and it is argued that the DSSA version handles better than the SSSA as it has less flex in the swing arm.

In 2002, a limited-production Centennial Edition (CE) Daytona 955i was offered. The 955i CE had several noteworthy additions to and differences from the non-CE '02 DSSA Daytona 955i:

 One colour option of Aston (British Racing) Green, which was offered only on the 2002 955i Centennial Edition.
 Carbon fibre infill panels between the fuel tank and tail fairing.
 Carbon fibre infill panels between the fuel tank and front fairing.
 Single-sided swing arm (like the previous and later Daytona 955i).

In 2002 a limited-production Special Edition (SE) Daytona 955i was offered. The 955i SE model similar to the CE, except with red body work and the deletion of the centennial logos. 
  
In 2004, some minor changes were made including the deletion of the Union Jack logos.

In 2005 the bodywork was revised to include a horizontally-split headlamp, a more streamlined upper fairing, and a reduced tail 'hump'.  The frame was also painted black instead of the silver of all previous models. The fuel-injection system was changed from a bypass-regulated-rail to a returnless-rail system.

Specifications

References

External links
 Triumph Daytona
 Motorcycle Online T595 First Impression (1997)
 Motorcycle Online road test of 2002 Daytona 955i
 Extract from Motorcycle Fuel Injection Handbook (Adam Wade)
 Bikepoint - Review of the T595 to 955i History (2005)

Daytona 955
Sport bikes
Motorcycles introduced in 1997